ABMB may refer to:

 Air Battle Manager Badge, a military badge
 "Always Be My Baby", a pop-R&B song